Stary Biyaz (İśke Biäz) is a rural locality (a village) in Novosubayevsky Selsoviet, Nurimanovsky District, Bashkortostan, Russia. The population was 82 as of 2010. There is 1 street.

Geography 
Stary Biyaz is located 24 km southeast of Krasnaya Gorka (the district's administrative centre) by road. Nur is the nearest rural locality.

References 

Rural localities in Nurimanovsky District